May Maadham is a 1994 Indian Tamil-language romance film directed by Venus Balu. The film stars Vineeth and Sonali Kulkarni, and has music by A. R. Rahman. It is based on the 1953 American film Roman Holiday. The film was released on 9 September 1994.

Plot 

Sandhya is the only daughter of big shot who always controls her life and schedules her activities. When she finds out he has planned to get her married with a US immigrant, she decides to run away from her family to Madras. Due to some unfortunate events, Sandhya loses her money because of a young photographer Eeshwar and now she is stuck with him until he repays her cash. As the story unfolds, her family finds her in Madras and love blossoms between the two.

Cast 

 Vineeth as Eeshwar
 Sonali Kulkarni as Sandhya
 Manorama as Aandal
 Kaka Radhakrishnan as Sadha Sivam
 Janagaraj as Captain
 R. Sundarrajan as All in All Ayyasamy
 P. C. Ramakrishna as Rangarajan, Sandhya's father
 Rajeshkumar as Rajeshkumar
 Pandu as Police constable
 Anand Krishnamoorthi as Thirugnana Sambanthan (Calcutta)
 Oru Viral Krishna Rao as Colony resident
 Madhan Bob as Ramasamy
 S. N. Lakshmi as Sandhya's grandmother
 C. R. Saraswathi
 Sathyapriya as Female pimp
 Pasi Sathya as Poongodi
 A. V. Ramanan
 Marthandan as Mad man
 Vellai Subbaiah as Customer
 Jaya Prahasam as Gurusamy
 Mounika in a special appearance in song "Aadipaaru Mangatha"
 Silk Smitha in a special appearance in song "Palakattu Machanukku"

Production 
The film marks Sonali Kulkarni's Tamil film debut. She was encouraged to audition for the film by Mani Ratnam. The song "Madrasa Suthi" was filmed in Marina Beach.

Soundtrack 
The soundtrack was composed by A. R. Rahman with lyrics by Vairamuthu. Rahman reused the songs in the Hindi film Love You Hamesha (2022), and the Telugu dub Hrudayaanjali. The song "Margazhi Poove" is set in Hindolam raaga, while "Enmel Vizhundha Mazhaithuli" is set in Kapi. In a 2018 interview, Vairamuthu recalled that after he had written most of the lyrics for the song "Margazhi Poove", Rahman wanted him to write further lyrics for "a short tune that plays between the BGM". Vairamuthu felt it was impossible to fit words into the tune but Rahman remained adamant. Though irritated, Vairamuthu accepted the challenge and found the perfect lyrics: "Venba... Paadivarum Vandukku/ Senthaen... Thandhuvidum sempookkal/ Konjam... Paadavarum Pennukku/ Sandham... Thandhuvidum Mynahkkal".

Release and reception 
May Maadham was released on 9 September 1994. Malini Mannath of The Indian Express wrote on the same day, "Despite its flaws, May Maadham is an engaging little film that is worth viewing". Indolink wrote "Its A.R.Rehmaan who again comes to the rescue in this love story that loses direction to say the least. A simple story of love that doesnt have any unnecessary opposition (thank heavens) should have been more efficiently handled as there isnt much scope for melodrama here. So the director decided to adopt a tongue-in-cheek attitude, with Crazy Mohan's script coming in handy, but after the half way stage, it fails to grip you and you just wait there for it to end". Thulasi of Kalki appreciated the film for Sreeram's cinematography, Rahman's music, Mohan's dialogues and the cast performances. The film was commercially unsuccessful, breaking GV Films' success streak that began in 1990. The film was subsequently dubbed in Telugu under the title Hrudayanjali in 1998.

References

External links 
 

1990s romantic musical films
1990s Tamil-language films
1994 directorial debut films
1994 films
1994 romantic comedy films
Films scored by A. R. Rahman
Films set in Chennai
Films shot in Chennai
Films shot in Ooty
Indian remakes of American films
Indian romantic comedy films
Indian romantic musical films